was the 40th Emperor of Japan, according to the traditional order of succession.

Tenmu's reign lasted from 673 until his death in 686.

Traditional narrative
Tenmu was the youngest son of Emperor Jomei and Empress Kōgyoku, and the younger brother of the Emperor Tenji. His name at birth was Prince Ōama (大海人皇子:Ōama no ōji). He was succeeded by Empress Jitō, who was both his niece and his wife. During the reign of his elder brother, Emperor Tenji, Tenmu was forced to marry several of Tenji's daughters because Tenji thought those marriages would help to strengthen political ties between the two brothers. The nieces he married included Princess Unonosarara, today known as Empress Jitō, and Princess Ōta. Tenmu also had other consorts whose fathers were influential courtiers.

Tenmu had many children, including his crown prince Kusakabe by Princess Unonosarara; Princess Tōchi; Prince Ōtsu and Princess Ōku by Princess Ōta (whose father also was Tenji); and Prince Toneri, the editor of the Nihon Shoki and father of Emperor Junnin. Through Prince Kusakabe, Tenmu had two emperors and two empresses among his descendants. Empress Kōken was the last of these imperial rulers from his lineage.

Events of Tenmu's life
Emperor Tenmu is the first monarch of Japan, to whom the title Tennō (Emperor of Japan) was assigned contemporaneously—not only by later generations.

The only document on his life was Nihon Shoki. However, it was edited by his son, Prince Toneri, and the work was written during the reigns of his wife and children, causing one to suspect its accuracy and impartiality. He is also mentioned briefly in the preface to the Kojiki, being hailed as the emperor to have commissioned them.

Tenmu's father died while he was young, and he grew up mainly under the guidance of Empress Saimei.  He was not expected to gain the throne, because his brother Tenji was the crown prince, being the older son of their mother, the reigning empress.

During the Tenji period, Tenmu was appointed his crown prince. This was because Tenji had no appropriate heir among his sons at that time, as none of their mothers was of a rank high enough to give the necessary political support. Tenji was suspicious that Tenmu might be so ambitious as to attempt to take the throne, and felt the necessity to strengthen his position through politically advantageous marriages.

Tenji was particularly active in improving the military institutions which had been established during the Taika reforms.

In his old age, Tenji had a son, Prince Ōtomo, by a low-ranking consort. Since Ōtomo had weak political support from his maternal relatives, the general wisdom of the time held that it was not a good idea for him to ascend to the throne, yet Tenji was obsessed with the idea.

In 671 Tenmu felt himself to be in danger and volunteered to resign the office of crown prince to become a monk. He moved to the mountains in Yoshino, Yamato Province (now Yoshino, Nara),  officially for reasons of seclusion.  He took with him his sons and one of his wives, Princess Unonosarara, a daughter of Tenji. However, he left all his other consorts at the capital, Omikyō in Ōmi Province (today in Ōtsu).

A year later, (in 672) Tenji died and Prince Ōtomo ascended to the throne as Emperor Kōbun. Tenmu assembled an army and marched from Yoshino to the east, to attack the capital of Omikyō in a counterclockwise movement. They marched through Yamato, Iga and Mino Provinces to threaten Omikyō in the adjacent province. The army of Tenmu and the army of the young Emperor Kōbun fought in the northwestern part of Mino (nowadays Sekigahara, Gifu), an incident known as the Jinshin War. Tenmu's army won and Kōbun committed suicide.

Post-Meiji chronology
 In the 10th year of Tenji, in the 11th month (671): Emperor Tenji, in the 10th year of his reign (天智天皇十年), designated his son as his heir; and modern scholars construe this as meaning that the son would have received the succession (senso) after his father's death.  Shortly thereafter, Emperor Kōbun is said to have acceded to the throne (sokui).  If this understanding were valid, then it would follow:
 In the 1st year of Kōbun (672): Emperor Kōbun, in the 1st year of his reign (弘文天皇一年), died; and his uncle Ōaomi-shinnō received the succession (senso) after the death of his nephew.  Shortly thereafter, Emperor Tenmu could be said to have acceded to the throne (sokui).

Pre-Meiji chronology
Prior to the 19th century, Otomo was understood to have been a mere interloper, a pretender, an anomaly; and therefore, if that commonly accepted understanding were to have been valid, then it would have followed:
 In the 10th year of Tenji, in the 11th month (671): Emperor Tenji, in the 10th year of his reign (天智天皇十年), died; and despite any military confrontations which ensued, the brother of the dead sovereign would have received the succession (senso);  and after a time, it would have been understood that Emperor Tenmu rightfully acceded to the throne (sokui).

As might be expected, Emperor Tenmu was no less active than former-Emperor Tenji in improving the Taika military institutions. Tenmu's reign brought many changes, such as: (1) a centralized war department was organized; (2) the defenses of the Inner Country near the Capital were strengthened; (3) forts and castles were built near Capital and in the western parts of Honshū—and in Kyushu; (4) troops were reviewed; and all provincial governors were ordered to complete the collection of arms and to study tactics.

In 673 Tenmu moved the capital back to Yamato on the Kiymihara plain, naming his new capital Asuka. The Man'yōshū includes a poem written after the Jinshin War ended:

At Asuka, Emperor Tenmu was enthroned. He elevated Unonosarara to be his empress. Events of his reign include:
 674 (Tenmu 2): Ambassadors of Tane no kuni were received in the Japanese court.
 680 (Tenmu 8): Yakushi-ji was founded in the Hakuhō period.

Tenmu reigned from this capital until his death in 686. His wife, Empress Jito became the emperor until their son became the 42nd Emperor. The actual site of his grave is known.  This emperor is traditionally venerated at a memorial shrine (misasagi) in Nara Prefecture. The Imperial Household Agency designates this location as Tenmu's mausoleum.  It is formally named Hinokuma no Ōuchi no misasagi.

Buddhism
In 675 Emperor Tenmu banned the consumption of domesticated animal meat (horse, cattle, dogs, monkeys, birds), from April 1 to September 30 each year, due to the influence of Buddhism.

Politics

In the Nihon Shoki, Tenmu is described as a great innovator, but the neutrality of this description is doubtful, since the work was written under the control of his descendants. It seems clear, however, that Tenmu strengthened the power of the emperor and appointed his sons to the highest offices of his government, reducing the traditional influence of powerful clans such as the Ōtomo and Soga clans. He renewed the system of kabane, the hereditary titles of duty and rank, but with alterations, including the abolition of some titles. Omi and Muraji, the highest kabane in the earlier period, were reduced in value in the new hierarchy, which consisted of eight kinds of kabane. Each clan received a new kabane according to its closeness to the imperial bloodline and its loyalty to Tenmu.

Tenmu attempted to keep a balance of power among his sons. Once he traveled to Yoshino together with his sons, and there had them swear to cooperate and not to make war on each other. This turned out to be ineffective: one of his sons, Prince Ōtsu, was later executed for treason after the death of Tenmu.

Tenmu's foreign policy favored the Korean kingdom Silla, which took over the entire Korean peninsula in 676. After the unification of Korea by Silla, Tenmu decided to break diplomatic relations with the Tang dynasty of China, evidently in order to keep on good terms with Silla.

Tenmu used religious structures to increase the authority of the imperial throne. During his reign there was increased emphasis on the tie between the imperial household and Ise Grand Shrine (dedicated to the ancestor goddess of the emperors, Amaterasu) by sending his daughter Princess Ōku as the newly established Saiō of the shrine, and several festivals were financed from the national budget. He also showed favor to Buddhism, and built several large temples and monasteries. It is said that Tenmu asked that each household was encouraged to build an altar with a dais where a Buddha-image and a sutra could be placed so that family worshiping could be held, thus inventing the butsudan. On the other hand, all Buddhist priests, monks and nuns were controlled by the state, and no one was allowed to become a monk without the state's permission. This was aimed at preventing cults and stopping farmers from turning into priests.

Kugyō
Kugyō is a collective term for the very few most powerful men attached to the court of the Emperor of Japan in pre-Meiji eras.

In general, this elite group included only three to four men at a time.  These were hereditary courtiers whose experience and background would have brought them to the pinnacle of a life's career.  During Tenmu's reign, this apex of the  Daijō-kan included:
 Sadaijin, Soga no Akae no Omi 
 Udaijin, Nakatomi no Kane no Muraji 
 Naidaijin

Era of Tenmu's reign
The years of Tenmu's reign were marked by only one era name or nengō, which was proclaimed in the final months of the emperor's life; and Shuchō ended with Tenmu's death.
 Shuchō  (686)

Non-nengō period
The early years of Tenmu's reign are not linked by scholars to any era or nengō.  The Taika era innovation of naming time periods – nengō – was discontinued during these years, but it was reestablished briefly in 686.  The use of nengō languished yet again after Tenmu's death until Emperor Monmu reasserted an imperial right by proclaiming the commencement of Taihō in 701.
 See Tenmu period (673–686).

In this context, Brown and Ishida's translation of Gukanshō offers an explanation about the years of Empress Jitō's reign which muddies a sense of easy clarity in the pre-Taihō time-frame:
"The eras that fell in this reign were: (1) the remaining seven years of Shuchō [(686+7=692?)]; and (2) Taika, which was four years long [695–698]. (The first year of this era was kinoto-hitsuji [695].)  ... In the third year of the Taika era [697], Empress Jitō yielded the throne to the Crown Prince."

Wives and children
Empress (Kōgō): Princess Uno-no-sarara (鸕野讃良皇女) later Empress Jitō, Emperor Tenji's daughter
Second Son: Prince Kusakabe (草壁皇子, 662 – 10 May 689), Father of Emperor Monmu and Empress Genshō
Consort (Hi):  Princess Ōta (大田皇女), Emperor Tenji's daughter
Second daughter: Princess Ōku (大伯皇女, 12 February 661– 29 January 702 ), Saiō in Ise Shrine (673–686)
Third Son: Prince Ōtsu (大津皇子, 663 – 25 October 686  )
Consort (Hi) Princess Ōe (大江皇女), Emperor Tenji's daughter
Seventh Son: Prince Naga (長皇子, d. 9 July 715)
Ninth Son: Prince Yuge (弓削皇子, d. 21 August 699)
Consort (Hi): Princess Niitabe (新田部皇女), Emperor Tenji's daughter
Sixth Son: Prince Toneri (舎人皇子, 676 – 2 December 735), Father of Emperor Junnin
Madame (Bunin): Fujiwara no Hikami-no-iratsume (藤原氷上娘, d.682), Fujiwara no Kamatari's daughter
Daughter: Princess Tajima (但馬皇女, d. 17 July 708), married to Prince Takechi
Madame (Bunin): Fujiwara no Ioe-no-iratsume (藤原五百重娘), Fujiwara no Kamatari's daughter
Tenth Son: Prince Niitabe (新田部皇子, d. 20 0ctomber 735)
Madame (Bunin) Soga no Ōnu-no-iratsume (蘇我大蕤娘), Soga no Akae's daughter
Fifth Son: Prince Hozumi (穂積皇子, d. 30 August 715)
Daughter: Princess Ki (紀皇女)
Daughter: Princess Takata (田形皇女, d. 18 April 728), Saiō in Ise Shrine (706–707), later married to Prince Mutobe
Beauty (Hin): Princess Nukata (額田王), Prince Kagami's daughter
First Daughter: Princess Tōchi (十市皇女, d. 3 March 678 ), married to Emperor Kōbun
Beauty (Hin): Munakata no Amako-no-iratsume (胸形尼子娘), Unakata-no-Kimi Tokuzen's daughter
First Son: Prince Takechi (高市皇子, 654 – 13 August 696)
Beauty (Hin): Shishihito no Kajihime-no-iratsume (宍人梶媛娘), Shishihito-no-Omi Ōmaro's daughter
Fourth Son: Prince Osakabe (刑部/忍壁皇子, d. 2 June 705)
Daughter: Princess Hatsusebe (泊瀬部皇女, d.28 March 741), married to Prince Kawashima (son of Emperor Tenji)
Daughter: Princess Taki (託基皇女/多紀皇女, d. 751), Saiō in Ise Shrine (698–before 701), later married to Prince Shiki (son of Emperor Tenji) 
Son: Prince Shiki (磯城皇子)

Ancestry

See also

 Emperor of Japan
 List of Emperors of Japan
 Imperial cult

References

Further reading
 Asakawa, Kan'ichi. (1903).    The Early Institutional Life of Japan. Tokyo: Shueisha. ;  see online, multi-formatted, full-text book at openlibrary.org
 Aston, William. (1896).  Nihongi: Chronicles of Japan from the Earliest Times to A.D. 697. London: Kegan Paul, Trench, Trubner. 
 Brown, Delmer M. and Ichirō Ishida, eds. (1979).  Gukanshō: The Future and the Past. Berkeley: University of California Press. ; 
 Nippon Gakujutsu Shinkokai (1969). The Man'yōshū: The Nippon Gakujutsu Shinkokai Translation of One Thousand Poems.  New York: Columbia University Press. 
 Ponsonby-Fane, Richard. (1959).  The Imperial House of Japan. Kyoto: Ponsonby Memorial Society. 
 Titsingh, Isaac. (1834). Nihon Ōdai Ichiran; ou,  Annales des empereurs du Japon.  Paris: Royal Asiatic Society, Oriental Translation Fund of Great Britain and Ireland. 
 Varley, H. Paul. (1980).  Jinnō Shōtōki: A Chronicle of Gods and Sovereigns. New York: Columbia University Press. ;

External links

 Asuka Historical National Government Park:  image of Mausoleum Emperor Tenmu and Empress Jitō , exterior view

 
 

 
631 births
686 deaths
7th-century monarchs in Asia
7th-century Japanese monarchs
Japanese emperors
People of Asuka-period Japan
Buddhism in the Asuka period
Man'yō poets